At least six ships of the Imperial Russian Navy, Soviet Navy or Russian Navy have been named Sevastopol after 
the Siege of Sevastopol (1854–1855) or the city of the same name.

  - 14-gun schooner that was broken up after 1833.
  - armored frigate that was converted to an ironclad while under construction
  -  pre-dreadnought battleship scuttled during the Russo-Japanese War of 1904–1905
  -  that participated in World War I and World War II before she was scrapped in 1949
  -  launched in 1967 and scrapped in 1991.
  -  subsequently sold to Egypt before delivery.

Russian Navy ship names